Eric Paul Lefkofsky (born September 2, 1969) is an American billionaire businessman. He is the founder of Tempus, and the co-founder of Groupon,  Echo Global Logistics (ECHO), InnerWorkings (INWK), and Mediaocean.  He is an early investor in Uptake, and the managing director of Chicago-based venture capital firm Lightbank. As of October 2021, his net worth was estimated at US$4.1 billion.

Biography
Lefkofsky grew up in a Jewish family In Southfield, Michigan, the son of Bill, a structural engineer, and Sandy, a school teacher. He attended Tamarack Camps as a youth and later worked as a staff member. After graduating from Southfield-Lathrup High School in 1987, he attended the University of Michigan and graduated with honors in 1991. He enrolled at University of Michigan Law School and received his Juris Doctor in 1993.

Entrepreneurial ventures
In 1993, after law school, Lefkovsky and a college friend, Brad Keywell, borrowed money from relatives to buy Brandon Apparel, a clothing company in Madison, Wisconsin. . In 1999, they created an Internet company, Starbelly, that specialized in promotional products. In January 2000, Lefkofsky and Keywell sold the firm to Halo Industries. Lefkofsky joined Halo as chief operating officer. A little more than a year later, the company went bankrupt, and the firm faced multiple lawsuits from shareholders, all of which were resolved by 2004.

In fall 2001, Lefkofsky co-founded InnerWorkings, a firm providing print procurement services for mid-sized companies. In August 2006, the company went public with an initial public offering. Lefkofsky served on its board of directors until October 2012.

In February 2005, Lefkofsky and Keywell created a freight logistics company, Echo Global Logistics. It attracted financing from New Enterprise Associates, and went public on the NASDAQ under the symbol 'ECHO' in June 2006. 

In June 2006, Lefkofsky and Keywell founded MediaBank, a company providing technology for  advertising buyers. In June 2007, the firm acquired Datatech, a media planning and procurement platform. In July 2007, New Enterprise Associates invested in MediaBank. In 2012, a merger between MediaBank and Donovan Data Systems created Mediaocean in a deal estimated at $1.5 billion.

In January 2007, Lefkofsky provided $1 million in funding for ThePoint.com, a collective action website started by ex-InnnerWorkings employee Andrew Mason. New Enterprise Associates led an early stage investment round. In late 2008, the site changed its name to Groupon.com. In October 2009, Groupon raised $30 million from Accel Partners and New Enterprise Associates. In April 2010, Digital Sky Technology and Battery Ventures invested $135 million in Groupon at a valuation of $1.35 billion.

In December 2010, Google offered a reported $6 billion for Groupon. The offer was turned down, possibly due to anti-trust and regulatory scrutiny the deal might face. In October 2011, Groupon  raised $950 million in private funding  and then paid $810 million to employees and investors. Lefkofsky and his family were paid $398 million.  In August 2013, Lefkofsky became CEO of Groupon; in November 2016, he stepped down as CEO, resuming his role as Chairman.

In July 2014, Lefkofsky was an early investor in Uptake, LLC, an analytics company. In 2016, Lefkofsky founded Tempus, a technology company that enables physicians to deliver personalized cancer care, and serves as its CEO.

Philanthropy
In 2006, Lefkofsky and his wife, Liz, formed a private charitable trust, The Lefkofsky Family Foundation. Its purpose is to advance high-impact initiatives that enhance the quality of human life in the communities they serve. The foundation has helped fund more than 50 organizations to date.

In 2013, Lefkofsky and his wife joined The Giving Pledge.

Community interests
Lefkofsky is on the board of directors at Children's Memorial Hospital in Chicago, the board of directors of The Art Institute of Chicago, the board of directors of The Museum of Science and Industry, and a Trustee of Steppenwolf Theatre Company He is a board member of World Business Chicago, and serves as co-chairman of its Technology Council.

In May 2008, Lefkofsky joined the committee to bring the 2016 Summer Olympics to Chicago, Chicago 2016.

Teaching and writing
Lefkofsky taught applied technology at DePaul University's Kellstadt Graduate School of Business. At the Kellogg School of Management at Northwestern University, he taught a course in disruptive business models. He is now an adjunct professor at the University of Chicago Booth School of Business, teaching a course on entrepreneurship and building technology-based businesses.

In November 2007, Easton Studio Press published Lefkofsky's Accelerated Disruption, a book about how technology affects business.

Personal life
In 1997, Lefkofsky married Elizabeth (née Kramer). They have three children.

References

External links
 

1969 births
American billionaires
Jewish American philanthropists
Philanthropists from Illinois
DePaul University faculty
Giving Pledgers
21st-century philanthropists
Living people
Businesspeople from Chicago
People from Glencoe, Illinois
People from Southfield, Michigan
University of Michigan Law School alumni
American chief executives
21st-century American Jews